The An'gol Line is a non-electrified railway line of the Korean State Railway in Manp'o city, Chagang Province, North Korea, running from Mun'ak on the Pukbunaeryuk Line to An'gol.

Route 

A yellow background in the "Distance" box indicates that section of the line is not electrified.

References

Railway lines in North Korea
Standard gauge railways in North Korea